Emory Entrepreneurship & Venture Management (EEVM) is a student-run organization dedicated to encouraging entrepreneurship and business development in the Atlanta, Georgia area.  EEVM was founded in 2012 by Emory University undergraduates. Today, EEVM members include Emory undergraduate, graduate, professional students, and faculty, as well as several hundred Emory alumni around the world.

HackATL 
HackATL is EEVM's annual three-day hackathon competition.  The event is open to all college students as well as working professionals. The inaugural HackATL event was held at the Goizueta Business School and had over 400 participants from 80 different universities.

StartupCrunch 
StartupCrunch is a monthly dinner event open to the Atlanta community focused on fostering the entrepreneurship community. The event has invited speakers from around the United States as well as provided an opportunity for local startups to pitch and receive advice.

Emory Entrepreneurial Excellerator 
Founded in 2014 by Nihar Parikh, the Emory Entrepreneurial Excellerator is designed to coax talent and results out of Emory's entrepreneurial community. The program takes Emory-founded startups from conception to the initial pitch phase, and culminates with the companies in the program pitching to Atlanta venture capital firms. The program will help Emory and The Goizueta Business School establish themselves as a force in the South's vibrant startup community.

The pre-accelerator has three components to it: Work sessions, a speaking series and a mentoring program.

Work Sessions 
A primary component of the program is ensuring the startups maintain a consistent work schedule so they can accomplish their goals in a timely fashion. Work sessions will feature resources including computer lab type rooms work rooms, either in the library or the business school, resource materials compiled by EEVM only available during work sessions, and an EEVM mentor present to mediate the meeting as well as offer basic suggestions. Teams will be required to submit deliverables on specific topics after each work sessions.

Speaker Series 
EEVM will bring in speakers twice a month, prioritizing startup veterans or members of other incubators like Hypepotamus, ATDC, Tech Village, etc. Topics will focus on early stage startup development, including but not limited to determining market potential, assigning roles, and incorporating and other legal advice.

Mentor Open Hours 
Goizueta professors and faculty members will be available for limited periods every week for guidance. Startups can use these resources to test ideas on more experienced individuals as well as ask for guidance on specific technical topics, such as market research techniques and financial modeling. To best utilize mentor schedules, startups must ask for an appointment with the mentor and come prepared with a problem statement.

References

External links 
 Official website
 Excellerator's official website 

Entrepreneurship organizations
Emory University